Nervia pinheyi is a species of butterfly in the family Hesperiidae. It is found in north-western Zambia.

References

Butterflies described in 1982
Endemic fauna of Zambia
Butterflies of Africa